Erigeron oreganus is a rare North American species of flowering plant in the family Asteraceae, called the gorge fleabane. It has been found only in the Columbia River Gorge along the border between the US states of Washington and Oregon.

Erigeron oreganus is a perennial herb up to 15 centimeters (6 inches) tall, with a large taproot. The plant generally produces 1-4 flower heads per stem, each head with up to 60 white or pink ray florets surrounding numerous yellow disc florets. The species grows in moist, shaded cliffs and ledges.

References

External links
Paul Slichter. Fleabanes of the Columbia River Gorge,  Columbia Gorge Daisy, Gorge Daisy, Gorge Fleabane, Oregon Fleabane  Erigeron oreganus photos
Oregon Flora Image Project, Erigeron oreganus A. Gray, gorge fleabane - native

Flora of the Northwestern United States
oreganus
Plants described in 1883
Flora without expected TNC conservation status